Serpocaulon sessilifolium is a species of fern in the family Polypodiaceae. It is native to Costa Rica and northern and western South America (Colombia, Venezuela, Ecuador, Peru, Bolivia and Guyana). Under the synonym Polypodium rimbachii, it was regarded as endemic to Ecuador and threatened by habitat loss.

References

Polypodiaceae
Flora of Costa Rica
Flora of northern South America
Flora of western South America
Taxonomy articles created by Polbot
Taxobox binomials not recognized by IUCN